Anuppur Junction railway station  is a railway station in Anuppur town of Anuppur district in Madhya Pradesh. The station code of Anuppur Junction is 'APR'. It has four platforms. It comes under Bilaspur railway division of South East Central Railway Zone.

Trains

 Durg–Firozpur Cantonment Antyodaya Express
 Durg–Hazrat Nizamuddin Humsafar Express
 Sarnath Express
 Bhopal–Bilaspur Express
 Betwa Express
 Durg–Nautanwa Express (via Sultanpur)
 Durg–Nautanwa Express (via Varanasi)
 Hirakud Express
 Amarkantak Express
 Lucknow–Raipur Garib Rath Express
 Durg–Chirimiri Express
 Durg–Ambikapur Express
 Bhopal–Chirimiri Express
 Barauni–Gondia Express
 Bilaspur–Rewa Express
 Kalinga Utkal Express
 Durg–Jammu Tawi Superfast Express
 Chhattisgarh Sampark Kranti Superfast Express
 Madan Mahal–Ambikapur Intercity Express
 Shalimar–Udaipur City Weekly Express
 Shalimar–Bhuj Weekly Superfast Express
 Narmada Express
 Durg–Jammu Tawi Express
 Bikaner–Bilaspur Antyodaya Express
 Durg–Ajmer Express
 Visakhapatnam–Bhagat Ki Kothi Express
 Durg–Jaipur Weekly Express
 Valsad–Puri Superfast Express
 Bikaner–Puri Express

References

Railway stations in Anuppur district
Bilaspur railway division
Railway junction stations in Madhya Pradesh